James Horace Smith (October 20, 1852 - June 20, 1931) was the seventeenth Mayor of Orlando from 1904 to 1906. He died at the age of 78 in 1931 and was buried in Greenwood Cemetery

References

Mayors of Orlando, Florida
1852 births
1931 deaths